Peckham Library is a library and community building situated in Peckham in south-east London. It was designed by Alsop and Störmer, engineered by AKT II and won the Stirling Prize for Architecture in 2000.

It is a striking building best imagined as an inverted capital letter 'L', with the upper part supported by thin steel pillars set at apparently random angles. The exterior is clad with pre-patinated copper.

The Stirling prize judges were impressed with the building's approach. Alsop has taken the plan footprint of a conventional library and elevated it to create a public space beneath the building and to remove the quiet reading space from street level noise. The remaining, supporting buildings on the ground and 1st floors house the information and media centre. The building is five floors in total, with the library service taking up the fourth floor.

The library opened to the public on March 8, 2000, with an official opening by Secretary of State for Culture, Media and Sport, Chris Smith, on May 15, 2000.

The building attracted 500,000 visitors in its first year of opening in the wake of its receipt of the prize. This dropped to approximately 420,000 for 2006.

Images

References

External links

Peckham Library on Southwark Council site
Peckham Library & Media Centre architecture page on Open University site
Peckham Library, London, UK guide on BBC h2g2 site

Library buildings completed in 2000
Libraries in the London Borough of Southwark
Public libraries in London
Will Alsop buildings
Library